Sir Quo-wei Lee  (5 August 1918 – 10 August 2013), with family roots in Kaiping, Guangdong, China, was a prominent Hong Kong businessman who served as Chairman of Hang Seng Bank and Chinese University of Hong Kong. Lee was awarded Honorary Fellow of the Hong Kong Securities and Investment Institute (HKSI) in 2006. He was one of the four co-founders of the Ho Leung Ho Lee Foundation, which promotes the development of science and technology in China.

Lee was created Commander of the Order of the British Empire in 1977, and made a Knight Bachelor in 1988. In the same year, he was also named as the head of the Hong Kong Stock Exchange. He was awarded a Grand Bauhinia Medal in 1997. He died 10 August 2013 at a Prince of Wales Hospital in Hong Kong.

References

1918 births
2013 deaths
Hong Kong chief executives
Hang Seng Bank
Hong Kong bankers
Members of the Executive Council of Hong Kong
Commanders of the Order of the British Empire
Knights Bachelor
Recipients of the Grand Bauhinia Medal
Hong Kong financial businesspeople
Hong Kong justices of the peace
People from Kaiping
Members of the Legislative Council of Hong Kong
Fellows of St Hugh's College, Oxford
Members of the Selection Committee of Hong Kong